is a video game developed and published by Sunsoft for the Family Computer. It was released exclusively in Japan in 1986 and was re-released for the two-in-one PlayStation game, Memorial Series SunSoft Vol. 3 alongside Tōkaidō Gojūsan-tsugi, another Sunsoft game.

Gameplay
The Wing of Madoola is a side scrolling action-adventure game. The player must progress through 16 stages, collecting items which increase the main character Lucia's power, and defeat the boss of each stage in order to gain entrance to the next stage. The Wing of Madoola resembles the anime , which was popular back when the game was being developed and released.

The game is considered to be difficult to beat. Although Lucia's strength and health increase throughout the game, enemies generally do large amounts of damage, and many continue to smash into Lucia for multiple consecutive hits. Some stages are very large, and it is easy to overlook some of the more necessary items that can make the completion of the game much easier. Many of the bosses can withstand a tremendous amount of damage before being defeated.

Plot
Once upon a time, in the Kingdom of Badham, there was a statue of a bird known as the Wing of Madoola. Whoever possessed the wing would possess the power to rule the world, and many wars were fought between nations to obtain it. A wise king, one of the members of the Rameru family, managed to get a hold of the wing, and ordered that a deep cave be constructed where the wings would be hidden so that the wars would cease. The knowledge of the cave would be recorded and locked away, accessible only to the rulers of the land. Peace soon returned to the world.

Several centuries later, a young member of the Rameru family known as Darutos learned of the location of the wing through the kingdom's secret archives. He betrayed the family and stole away with the Wing of Madoola. Using the power of the wing, he summoned demons to attack and take over castle Arekusu. He constructed an underground labyrinth beneath the castle, built a dangerous fortress, and planned to rule the world. The few survivors of Arekusu's military, and the remainder of the Rameru family fled the castle. They regrouped and devised a desperate plan to overthrow Darutos and regain control of the kingdom. Lucia, a brave warrior, was selected to accompany a member of the Rameru family who was uniquely capable of wielding magic known only to his family.

As they approached Arekusu, they were beset upon by two powerful demons. While one distracted Lucia, the other attacked the Rameru family member. Lucia battled both demons and defeated them, but not before her partner received a fatal wound. Knowing what had to be done, Lucia bravely pressed forward, knowing that only she could stop Darutos, and regain possession of the Wing of Madoola.

Reception and legacy

The Wing of Madoola was well received by video game critics. Its heroine Lucia has been featured in various manga series and also made guest appearances in the video games Barcode World for the Famicom on 1992, Shanghai Musume: Mahjong Girls for the iOS and Android in 2011, and as a Symbol Art's picture from Phantasy Star Online 2 on 2012.

References

External links
Memorial Series: SunSoft Vol. 3 official website

1986 video games
Action-adventure games
Fantasy video games
Japan-exclusive video games
Nintendo Entertainment System games
Side-scrolling video games
Sunsoft games
Video games developed in Japan
Video games featuring female protagonists
Virtual Console games